C/S (standing for Crime/Suspense, originally used as an on-air brand) was used for several Filipino entertainment channels owned by the Solar Entertainment Corporation. It showed mostly American crime and suspense dramas, mysteries, reality, science fiction and action shows.

History
Solar Entertainment first launched its namesake entertainment cable channel in the early 2000s, one devoted to American programs. This channel was later known as Solar USA (the acronym stands for "Ultimate in Suspense and Action"), and then later simply as USA. USA was replaced by two separate channels in 2005. Solar USA's comedy and general entertainment programming was moved to Jack TV, while action and crime dramas were given a new separate channel, Crime/Suspense, later launched in October of that year.

As part of a partnership established with the Radio Philippines Network, C/S became the on-air brand for its network of over-the-air stations across the Philippines on January 1, 2008. The C/S cable channel was later rebranded as C/S Origin in September of the same year, while the RPN network later changed its branding to C/S 9 the next month, and then changed its name to Solar TV on November 29, 2009.

On December 24, 2011, CHASE was launched. This is the revival TV network of C/S because of its similar format. On October 20, 2012, it was rebranded as Jack City, carrying the same format. On March 22, 2015, Jack City was rebranded as CT (now defunct).

Programs on C/S

Radio Philippines Network
Former Solar Entertainment Corporation channels
Defunct television networks in the Philippines
Television channels and stations established in 2005
Television channels and stations disestablished in 2009
English-language television stations in the Philippines